Sambucus pubens, the American red elder, is a species of elder (Sambucus) native to eastern North America. The  inflorescence is a rounded panicle, making the plant easy to distinguish from the more common S. canadensis, which has a more open, flattened corymb. Some authors have considered S. pubens to be conspecific with S. racemosa L.

Uses
Common name is "red-berried elder" or "red elderberry". The red berries are an important food source for many birds. They have a bitter taste and can cause digestive problems if eaten in large quantities by humans.

References

pubens
Flora of Canada
Flora of North America